Francisco Cerdá y Rico (1739–1800) was a Spanish erudite, humanist, jurist and writer.

People from Alicante
Spanish male writers
1739 births
1800 deaths